Franken-chickens, also called frankenchickens, are chickens genetically engineered and bred at an unnatural rate on factory farms.

Unlike natural chickens slaughtered after an average of 100 days, franken-chickens are slaughtered at around 47 days old and usually weigh more than twice the size of natural chickens. They also cost less and are less healthy to eat. The speed at which franken-chickens grow makes them cost less and can lead to a muscle disease that makes the meat higher in fat and less healthy to eat.

Breeding 
Selective breeding, as well as antibiotics and hormones, is largely responsible for the abnormal growth of franken-chickens. As a result, the chickens grow fast but suffer from lameness and deformed or twisted legs due to heavy weight on light bones, high fat, diseases and premature death.

Criticism 
In August 2021, Open Cages, which coined the term, released video footage claiming to show images of fast-growing birds deformed and dying on four intensive chicken farms. Weeks later, dozens of Morrisons' employee led nationwide protests claiming the supermarket sells franken-chickens. The Humane League has campaigned against the breeding of Franken-chickens. The Royal Society for the Prevention of Cruelty to Animals also condemned the method of breeding.

Marks & Spencer announced it will stop selling franken-chickens in their products by Autumn 2022. Waitrose and KFC have also pledged to stop selling them by 2026.

References 

Chicken as food
Genetic engineering
Poultry